Vultureşti may refer to several places in Romania:

 Vultureşti, a commune in Argeș County
 Vultureşti, a commune in Olt County
 Vultureşti, a commune in Suceava County
 Vultureşti, a commune in Vaslui County

See also 
 Vulturu (disambiguation)
 Vultureni (disambiguation)